Krasny Zilim (Qıźıl Yeźem) is a rural locality (a selo) and the administrative center of Krasnozilimsky Selsoviet, Arkhangelsky District, Bashkortostan, Russia. The population was 534 as of 2010. There are 10 streets.

Geography 
Krasny Zilim is located 19 km southwest of Arkhangelskoye (the district's administrative centre) by road. Orlovka is the nearest rural locality.

References 

Rural localities in Arkhangelsky District